The following are international rankings of Cuba.

Baseball 

 International Baseball Federation: Men's Baseball World Rankings, ranked 1 out of 73 countries

Demographics

United Nations: Population, ranked 74 out of 242 countries
CIA World Factbook: Urbanization ranked 46 out of 193 countries

Economy

United Nations Development Programme: Human Development Index 2019, ranked 72 out of 189 countries.
World Bank: GDP per capita 2011, ranked 92 out of 190 countries.
CIA World Factbook: GDP per capita 2011, ranked 92 out of 191 countries.

Education

 UNESCO: Youth Literacy Rate, ranked 6 out of 168 countries
UNESCO: Adult Literacy Rate, ranked 7 out of 171 countries
UNESCO: Elderly Literacy Rate, ranked 9 out of 168 countries
World bank: Quality of education, ranked 1 out of 18 Latin American and Caribbean countries

Environment

Yale Center for Environmental Law and Policy and Columbia Center for International Earth Science Information Network: 2016 Environmental Performance Index ranked 45 out of 180 countries.

Geography

Total area ranked 106 out of 249 countries and outlying territories.
Renewable water resources ranked 106 out of 174 countries.

Globalization

2017 KOF Index of Globalization: ranked 134 out of 207.
A.T. Kearney/ Foreign Policy magazine Globalization Index: not ranked.

Healthcare 

 World Bank: Mortality Rate Under 5, ranked 40 out of 215 countries.
 World Health Organization: Life expectancy, ranked 33 of 184 countries

Military
 

CIA World Factbook: Defense spending as a percent of  GDP, ranked 29 out of 172 countries.
Institute for Economics and Peace: 2016  Global Peace Index, ranked 85 out of 163.

Politics

Transparency International: 2017 Corruption Perceptions Index, ranked 62 out of 176 countries.
Inter-Parliamentary Union: Women in national parliaments, ranked 2 out of 192 countries.
Reporters Without Borders: 2016 Press Freedom Index, ranked 171 out of 180 countries.
The Economist Intelligence Unit: Democracy Index 2008, ranked 126 out of 167 countries.
Freedom House: 2012 Global Press Freedom: ranked 190 out of 197.

Society
United Nations Development Programme 2014 Human Development Index ranked 67 out of 187.
Economist Intelligence Unit: Quality-of-life Index not ranked
University of Leicester: 2006 Satisfaction with Life Index ranked 83 out of 178.

Tourism

Transportation

Motor vehicles per capita ranked 118 out of 144 countries

See also

Outline of Cuba
Index of Cuba-related articles

References

Politics of Cuba
Cuba